Mark Whitehead (February 14, 1961 – July 6, 2011) was an American cyclist. He competed in the men's points race at the 1984 Summer Olympics and won ten National championship titles.

Whitehead was inducted into the Lehigh Valley Velodrome Cycling Hall of Fame.

References

External links
 

1961 births
2011 deaths
American male cyclists
Olympic cyclists of the United States
Cyclists at the 1984 Summer Olympics
People from Bell, California
Cyclists from Los Angeles